Bellefleur is a community in the Canadian province of New Brunswick. It is situated in Saint-Léonard, a parish of Madawaska County. Being on the east bank of the Saint John River, Bellefleur is less than a mile away from the United States border.

History

Notable people

See also
List of communities in New Brunswick

References

Communities in Madawaska County, New Brunswick